The governor of West Virginia is the head of government of West Virginia and the commander-in-chief of the state's military forces. The governor has a duty to enforce state laws, and the power to either approve or veto bills passed by the West Virginia Legislature, to convene the legislature at any time, and, except when prosecution has been carried out by the House of Delegates, to grant pardons and reprieves.

Since West Virginia was admitted to the Union on June 20, 1863, during the American Civil War, 34 men have served as governor. Two, Arch A. Moore Jr. (West Virginia's 28th and 30th governors) and Cecil H. Underwood (West Virginia's 25th and 32nd governors), served two nonconsecutive terms in office. The longest-serving governor was Moore, who served for three terms over twelve years. The state's first governor after admission into the Union, Arthur I. Boreman, served the most consecutive terms, resigning a week before the end of his third term. Before the state's admission, Francis H. Pierpont, the, "Father of West Virginia," was elected governor during the Wheeling Convention of 1861. Daniel D.T. Farnsworth was senate president at the time; he filled the last seven days of Boreman's term and remains the shortest-serving governor. Underwood has the unusual distinction of being both the youngest person to be elected as governor (age 34 upon his first term in 1957) and the oldest to both be elected and serve (age 74 upon his second term in 1997; age 78 at the end of his second term in 2001).

The current governor is Republican Jim Justice, who assumed office on January 16, 2017. West Virginia's 36th governor, Justice was elected as a Democrat, but switched to the Republican Party on August 4 of that year.

To serve as governor, a person must be at least 30 years old, and must have been a citizen of West Virginia for at least five years at the time of inauguration. Under the current Constitution of West Virginia, ratified in 1872, the governor serves a four-year term commencing on the Monday after the second Wednesday in the January following an election. The original constitution of 1863 only called for a two-year term. He may be reelected any number of times, but not more than twice in a row. Any partial term served counts toward the limit of two consecutive terms.

The constitution makes no mention of a lieutenant governor; if the governorship becomes vacant, the senate president acts as governor. If more than one year remains in the governor's term at the time of vacancy, a new election is held; otherwise, the senate president acts as governor for the remainder of the term. A bill passed in 2000 grants the senate president the honorary title of lieutenant governor, but this title is rarely used in practice and the terms of the senate president do not correspond with governorships. The same bill states that the line of succession after the senate president will be the speaker of the House of Delegates, followed by the state attorney general, the state auditor and former governors, in inverse order of term, that are in residence in the state at the time of the vacancy.

Qualifications
Anyone who seeks to be elected Governor of West Virginia  must meet the following qualifications:
Be a citizen of the United States
Be a resident of West Virginia for at least five years preceding the election
Be a duly qualified elector of West Virginia
Be at least 30 years old

List of governors

The following list is based on that contained in the West Virginia Blue Book, the official guide to West Virginia state government.

 Parties

Succession

Notes

References
Specific

General

 
 Richard E. Fast. The history and government of West Virginia (1901) to 1900  online edition

Constitutions

External links
 

 Office of the Governor of West Virginia

Lists of state governors of the United States
Governors of West Virginia
Governors of West Virginia, List of